Moshe Amar (born 21 May 1922 – 30 November 2015) was an Israeli politician who served as a member of the Knesset for the Alignment between 1977 and 1981.

Biography
Born in Safed during the Mandate era, Amar studied at the Scottish College High School in Safed and then at the School for Jurisprudence, and was certified as a lawyer.

A member of the Hashomer Hatzair youth movement, he joined Mapam in 1951. He became secretary and chairman of the party's Haifa branch, and was a member of the party's secretariat and central committee. In 1977 he was elected to the Knesset on the Alignment list (an alliance of Mapam and the Labor Party), but lost his seat in the 1981 elections.

References

External links
 

1922 births
2015 deaths
People from Safed
Jews in Mandatory Palestine
Hashomer Hatzair members
Israeli lawyers
Alignment (Israel) politicians
Members of the 9th Knesset (1977–1981)